Syringa × chinensis, the Chinese lilac or Rouen lilac, is a hybrid species of flowering plant in the family Oleaceae.<ref name="MBG_253926" >{{cite web |url=https://www.missouribotanicalgarden.org/PlantFinder/PlantFinderDetails.aspx?taxonid=253926 |title=Syringa × chinensis |author= |date= |website=Plant Finder |publisher=Missouri Botanical Garden |access-date=27 January 2022 }}</ref> It was supposedly first noticed growing in Rouen, France in 1777. In spite of its specific and common names, it most probably originated in western Asia. It is the result of a cross between Syringa vulgaris (common lilac) and Syringa persica'' (Persian lilac). A shrub or shrubby tree reaching , it is hardy in USDA zones 3 to 7, and is recommended for borders, loose hedges, and foundations.

References

chinensis
Interspecific plant hybrids
Plant nothospecies
Ornamental trees
Plants described in 1796